Chožov is a municipality and village in Louny District in the Ústí nad Labem Region of the Czech Republic. It has about 500 inhabitants.

Administrative parts
Villages of Mnichovský Týnec and Třtěno are administrative parts of Chožov.

References

Villages in Louny District